The minnow-nase, (Chondrostoma phoxinus) is a species of freshwater fish in the family Cyprinidae.
It is found in Bosnia and Herzegovina and Croatia. Its natural habitats are rivers, intermittent rivers, and inland karsts.
It is threatened by habitat loss and considered Endangered (EN).

References

Chondrostoma
Cyprinid fish of Europe
Fish described in 1843
Taxonomy articles created by Polbot
Endemic fauna of the Balkans
Freshwater fish of Europe
Endemic fish of the Neretva basin
Species endangered by river-damming